The men's 600 metre free rifle was a shooting sports event held as part of the Shooting at the 1912 Summer Olympics programme. It was the only appearance of the event, though a 1000-yard free rifle event was held in 1908 and a 600-metre prone event was held in 1924. The competition was held on Monday, 1 July 1912.

Eighty-five sport shooters from twelve nations competed.

Results

References

External links
 
 

Shooting at the 1912 Summer Olympics
Men's 600m